The Prévost station (formerly the Shawbridge railway station) is a former Canadian Pacific railway station in Prévost, Quebec, Canada, formerly known as Shawbridge. It now serves as a café and cultural centre for area residents and users of the Parc Linéaire Le P'tit Train du Nord linear park cycling trail, and is no longer connected to the railway network.

References
“Le P’tit Train du Nord” Linear Park  Official site.
Comité de la Gare de Prévost  Official site.

Canadian Pacific Railway stations in Quebec
Railway stations in Laurentides
Disused railway stations in Canada